North Kuttanad, in Kerala, India, comprises Vaikom taluk, western parts of Kottayam taluk, and western parts of Changanacherry taluk in Kottayam district.

References

Villages in Kottayam district